Khawaja Abid Khan Siddiqi (b. 17th Century1687 d.), or Nawab Khawaja Abid Siddiqi/Khawaja Abid (Qalich Khan - title given by Shah Jahan) better known as Kilich Khan, was a Nawab and military general under Mughal Emperor Aurangzeb. He was a loyal general of the Mughal Empire. He was the father of Ghazi ud-Din Khan Siddiqi - Feroze Jung I (a Mughal general) and the grandfather of Mir Qamar-ud-din Siddiqi, Asaf Jah I.

Birth
Kilich Khan was born in Adilabad near the ancient Silk Road city of Samarkand. His father was Khawaja Ismail Khan Siddiqi Bayafandi s/o Shaikh Allahdad Khan Siddiqi Bayafandi s/o Shaikh Abdul Rehman Azizzan Khan Siddiqi Bayafandi the 14th in direct descent from Shihab al-Din 'Umar al-Suhrawardi of Sohrevard in Iran a celebrated Sufi mystic lived in Persia, a renowned scholar known for his piety and knowledge of the law and was even honored with the title Allum-ul-Ulema (wisest of the wise).

Through his father's side of the family, Nawab Kilich Khan could trace his lineage back 34 generations to the first Caliph of Islam, Abu Bakr Siddique since Nawab Kilich Khan was his direct descendant through the Bayafandi Clan in the 'Asir Region of Arabia, and on his mother's side of the family he can trace his ancestry to Prophet Muhammad.

Early life
Kilich Khan broke his family tradition and became a warrior rather than a scholar although he was well-versed in Islamic theology and Persian language. Kilich Khan is known to have utilized the composite bow and arrow, he kept the Quran attached to his quiver and rode along with a Crescent standard and a yellow flag.

Henry Briggs a historian wrote,

 In youth he was trained to the use of the bow, the spear and the sword. Riding on horseback was familiar to him from the moment he could toddle alone from his mother's knee as it is to this day to everybody from the plains of Arabia to the hills of Afghanistan and he was specially taught to regard the cause of the Crescent and the Quran as the great purpose of his existence.

It was in 1655 that Kilich Khan undertook a pilgrimage to Mecca. But on his way there he stopped off in Hindustan to present himself before Mughal Emperor Shah Jahan. The Mughal Emperor bestowed on Kilich Khan a Khilat or dress of honour and promised him that after he returned from Mecca he could take up a post on his personal staff.

Aurangzeb was trained by him. Under his command, Aurangzeb conquered central India and south India. He was Chief Commander of Aurangzeb's Army when Golconda was conquered.

He was promoted to Sadar-i-Qul ( Supt. of Endowments ) 1681 - 1685, Subedar of Ajmer 1667–1672, Subedar of Multan 1672–1676, Amir-i-Haj 1676–1680. Faujdar of Zafarabad ( Bidar ) 1686–1687. Granted the title of Azim Khan 1657, and Qilich Khan Bahadur 1680.

Later life
He returned from his pilgrimage to Mecca in Arabia to India in 1658 to take up his post serving the Emperor Shah Jahan, only to find that the Emperor had been taken ill and so Kilich Khan decided to throw his lot in with Prince Aurangzeb. Taking command of one of the Mughal armies, Kilich Khan played a crucial role in the Battle of Samugarh. For this, he was rewarded by being made Sadr us Sadur (President of Presidents) and one of the Emperor's most trusted generals.

He then proceeded to follow Aurangzeb around India as the Emperor pursued his dream of bringing all of Hindustan under the Timuri Flag. Many battles were fought and many Forts besieged but it was during the Siege of Golconda in 1687 that Kilich Khan shone through as the Emperors most loyal and courageous general. When Aurangzeb's army left to attack Golconda, it was under the command of Kilich Khan's son Ghazi ud-Din Khan Feroze Jung.

Ghazi ud-Din Khan Feroze Jung was so keen on taking the fort that in a sudden assault, he sent his father in charge of the storming party. However, Kilich Khan was hit by the shrapnel of a powerful cannonball, the bombardment which completely severed his arm. He returned to the Mughal camp on his horse refusing to dismount. Aurangzeb's Vizier-e-Azam (prime minister), Asad Khan noticed that while the surgeons were busy taking bits of bone and iron from his wound, he was stoically sipping coffee. Kilich Khan died a few days later, his arm was also found identified by the signet ring he always wore on his finger. Kilich Khan is buried in a tomb at Kismatpur near Himayat Sagar only a few Kilometers from where he had died at Golconda in Hyderabad, Telangana, India.

Children
Having had issue, five sons and two daughters. Nawab Ghaziuddin Khan Siddiqi Bayafandi, Nawab Khwaja Hamid Khan Bahadur Siddiqi Bayafandi, Nawab Rahim Chin Kilich Khan Bahadur Siddiqi Bayafandi and two sons died young. Khadija Begum Sahiba and another daughter married to Nawab Riyat Khan Bahadur.

Promotions
1000 zat (infantry, meaning that he had been granted lands that would provide 1000 infantry in times of battle) Granted in 1655 by Emperor Shah Jahan.
3000 zat and 500 sowar in 1657 (sowar were cavalry troops) Granted by Emperor Aurangzeb.
4000 zat and 700 sowar in 1658
4000 zat and 1500 sowar in 1665
5000 zat and 1500 sowar in 1681

See also
Hyderabad State
Nizam
Asaf Jahi dynasty

References

External links
https://www.auliadeccan.com/2020/12/hazrat-khaja-abid-kilich-khan-siddiqui.html by https://www.auliadeccan.com/ : (Himayat sagar Rajendar nagar:Hazrat khaja abid kilich khan siddiqui)

Bibliography
 Zubrzycki, John. (2006) The Last Nizam: An Indian Prince in the Australian Outback. Pan Macmillan, Australia. .

History of Hyderabad, India
Mughal generals
1687 deaths
Year of birth unknown
History of India
Nizams of Hyderabad